Clown Coaster is a children's steel coaster manufactured by Pinfari that opened at Wicksteed Park in Kettering, Northamptonshire, in October 2011. It previously operated in the Beaver Creek section of Pleasure Beach Blackpool from 1995 to 2008 as Circus Clown. The theming of the ride was a ride through a circus with Morgan the Clown. Prior to relocating to Pleasure Beach, Circus Clown operated for a season at Harbour Park. 

This ride was located in the Beaver Creek kids section of Pleasure Beach Blackpool, and opened in 1995. It was a simple track shape of an oval and contained only a few dips and the train was designed to look like a clown. The train consisted of four cars, each capable of seating four riders, the train normally did two laps of its oval shaped circuit.

The Ride was sold to a Travelling Showman in late 2008 and the ride operated at New Pleasureland in Southport for the 2009 Season; however, the ride left before the 2010 season started. In April 2011, the ride resurfaced as it was confirmed that Wicksteed Park had bought the rollercoaster. It was also confirmed that the coaster was bought for £20,000 and the original clown theme would be kept, with an additional £130,000 to be spent on refurbishment before a grand unveiling during the October half-term break.

Incidents
The rollercoaster rolled back in 2003 when the train was too heavy with the passengers on board.

References 

Family roller coasters
Blackpool Pleasure Beach
Roller coasters introduced in 1995
Amusement rides that closed in 2008
Roller coasters in the United Kingdom